The Rif or Riff, also called Rif Mountains, is a geographic region in northern Morocco. This mountainous and fertile area is bordered by Cape Spartel and Tangier to the west, by Berkane and the Moulouya River to the east, by the Mediterranean to the north, and by the Ouergha River to the south. The Rif mountains are separated into the eastern Rif mountains (Nador, Driouch, Al Hoceima) and western Rif mountains (Tangier, Tetouan, Chefchaouen, Taounate).

Geography
Geologically, the Rif Mountains belong to the Gibraltar Arc or Alborán Sea geological region. They are an extension of the Baetic System, which includes the mountains of the southern Iberian Peninsula across the strait. Thus, the Rif Mountains are not part of the Atlas Mountain System.

Major cities in the greater Rif region include Nador, Tangier, Tetouan, Al Hoceima (also called Villa), Imzouren, Driouch, Ben Taieb, Midar and Al Aaroui and a few (small) towns: Segangan, Selwan, Ajdir and Targuist (Targist).

History 
The Rif has been inhabited by Berbers since prehistoric times. As early as the 11th century BC, the Phoenicians began to establish trading posts with the approval of or partnership with the local Berbers; had started interbreeding and creating a Punic language on the Mediterranean and the Atlantic coasts; and had founded cities such as Tetouan, Rusadir (now Melilla) and (in the 5th century BC) Tingi (now Tangier). 

After the Third Punic War, the coast of North Africa came under the control of Rome, and the Rif became part of the Kingdom of Mauretania. When Mauretania was divided during the rule of Emperor Claudius, Tangier became the capital of Mauretania Tingitana. In the 5th century AD, the Roman rule came to an end, and the region was later reconquered and partly controlled by the Byzantine Empire.

In 710, Salih I ibn Mansur founded the Emirate of Nekor in the Rif, and Berbers started converting to Islam. By the 15th century, many Moors were exiled from Spain, and most of them settled in Western Rif and brought their culture, such as Andalusian music, and even established the city of Chefchaouen. Since then, the Rif has suffered numerous battles with Spain and Portugal. In 1415, Portugal invaded Ceuta, and in 1490 Spain conquered Melilla.

The Hispano-Moroccan War broke out in 1859 in Tetouan, and Morocco was defeated. The Spanish-Moroccan conflicts continued in the 20th century, under the leadership of Abd el-Krim, the Berber guerrilla leader who proclaimed the Republic of the Rif in 1921. The Riffian Berbers won several victories over the Spanish in the Rif War in the 1920s before they were eventually defeated. The Spanish region was decolonised and restored to Morocco by Spain in April 1956, a month after the French region gained its independence from France. Shortly afterward, a revolt broke out in the north against the Moroccan king by Riffian insurgents in 1958, but it was easily suppressed.

Economy

Farmers in the Rif produce most of Morocco's supply of cannabis. The region is economically underdeveloped.

Environment 

According to C. Michael Hogan, there are between five and eight separate subpopulations of the endangered primate Barbary macaque, Macaca sylvanus. The Rif mountains are also home to the honey bee subspecies Apis mellifera major.

The western and central portions are more rainy and are covered in forests of Atlas cedar, cork oak and holm oak, as well as the only remaining forests of Moroccan fir, a subspecies of the Spanish fir. The eastern slopes receive less rainfall, and there forests consist mainly of pines, particularly the Aleppo pine and the maritime pine, as well as tetraclinis.

Massive deforestation due to overgrazing, forest fires, and forest clearing for agriculture, particularly for the creation of cannabis plantations, has taken place since the 1950s. This deforestation has led to soil degradation due to the washing away of topsoil, which has aggravated the process.

See also 
 Ghomaras
 Hirak Rif
 Jebala people
 Iznasen
 Nekor
 Tanger-Tetouan-Al Hoceima
 Oriental (Morocco)
 Riffian

Footnotes

References
 Pierre-Arnaud Chouvy (2005). "Morocco said to produce nearly half of the world's hashish supply", Jane's Intelligence Review
 C. Michael Hogan (2008). "Barbary Macaque: Macaca sylvanus", Globaltwitcher.com, ed. Nicklas Stromberg

External links 

 Galerie Rif (Arrif) 
 Rif Map

 
Al Hoceïma Province
Berber history
Geography of Fès-Meknès
Geography of Oriental (Morocco)
Geography of Tanger-Tetouan-Al Hoceima
Geographic history of Morocco
Historical regions
Mountain ranges of Morocco